Lumbini is the place where Queen Mayadevi gave birth to Siddhartha Gautama in 563 BCE. There are number of historical Buddhist pilgrimage sites in Nepal.

Buddhist pilgrimage sites in Nepal

 Lumbini (There are over 60 excavation sites including Maya Devi Temple, World Peace Pagoda, Devdaha and Kudan Stupa / Nigrodharama), Kapilvastu District, Nepal
 Ramagrama stupa, Nawalparasi District of Nepal
 Koliya, Nawalparasi District of Nepal
 Swayambhunath, Kathmandu, Nepal
 Boudhanath, Kathmandu, Nepal
Namo Buddha - Kavrepalanchok District (place where the Bodhisattva offered his body to a tigress.)
 Patan Durbar Square, Lalitpur, Nepal
 Halesi-Maratika Caves (venerated site of Buddhist & Hindu pilgrimage), Khotang, District in Nepal

External links

  (Lumbini, the Birthplace of the Lord Buddha)
  (Holy Sites of Buddhism)

 
Buddhism in Nepal